Mitsuba may refer to:

 Mitsuba Corporation, a Japanese corporation
 Cryptotaenia japonica, a species of herbaceous perennial plants also known as Mitsuba
 Mitsuba, free and open-source software rendering system